Hodgesiella christophi is a moth of the family Cosmopterigidae that is endemic to Asia Minor.

Adults have been recorded from mid to the end of June.

References

Moths described in 2003
Cosmopteriginae